The men's sabre was one of eight fencing events on the fencing at the 1964 Summer Olympics programme. It was the fifteenth appearance of the event. The competition was held from October 19 to 20, 1964. 52 fencers from 21 nations competed. Nations had been limited to three fencers each since 1928. The event was won by Tibor Pézsa, the final of nine straight Games in which a Hungarian fencer won the event. The silver medal went to Claude Arabo of France, with Umyar Mavlikhanov of the Soviet Union taking bronze.

Background

This was the 15th appearance of the event, which is the only fencing event to have been held at every Summer Olympics. Four of the eight finalists from 1960 returned: bronze medalist Wladimiro Calarese of Italy, fourth-place finisher Claude Arabo of France, sixth-place finisher (and 1956 silver medalist) Jerzy Pawłowski of Poland (who, in 1968, would finally break the Hungarian run of nine straight gold medals in the event), and eighth-place finisher Yakov Rylsky of the Soviet Union. Rylsky had won three of the last five world championships (1958, 1961, and 1963). Pawłowski was the only other world champion present; he had won in 1957. Hungary, dominant in men's sabre since 1908, was finally thought vulnerable to the rising stars of Poland and the Soviet Union; the French champion, Arabo, was also a strong contender.

Ireland, Iran, Malaysia, and the Netherlands Antilles each made their debut in the men's sabre. Italy made its 13th appearance in the event, most of any nation, having missed the inaugural 1896 event and the 1904 St. Louis Games.

Competition format

The 1964 tournament introduced a hybrid pool-play and knockout format. The competition began with two rounds of pool play. In each round, the fencers were divided into pools to play a round-robin within the pool. Bouts were to five touches. Barrages were used to break ties necessary for advancement. The competition then shifted to knockout rounds. These rounds used a single-elimination tournament format to reduce the remaining field from 24 to 16, then from 16 to 8, then from 8 to 4. There were also classification semifinals and a fifth-place match for the quarterfinal losers. Bouts in these knockout rounds were to 10 touches. The four quarterfinal winners then resumed pool play once again for the final. Standard sabre rules were used.

 Round 1: There were 8 pools of 6 or 7 fencers each. The top 4 fencers in each pool advanced to round 2.
 Round 2: There were 4 pools of 8 fencers each. The top 4 fencers in each pool advanced to the knockout rounds.
 Knockout rounds: The 16 fencers were seeded into a truncated single-elimination tournament. Two knockout rounds were held, finishing with the quarterfinals.
 Classification: There were knockout-style classification matches for 5th place (two 5th–8th semifinals and a 5th/6th match).
 Final: The final pool had 4 fencers.

Schedule

All times are Japan Standard Time (UTC+9)

Results

Round 1

Round 1 pool A

 Barrage A

Round 1 pool B

Round 1 pool C

Round 1 pool D

Round 1 pool E

Round 1 pool F

Round 1 pool G

 Barrage G

Round 1 pool H

Round 2

Round 2 pool A

Round 2 pool B

Round 2 pool C

Round 2 pool D

Knockout rounds

The winner of each group advanced to the final pool, while the runner-up moved into a 5th-place semifinal.

Group 1

Group 2

Group 3

Group 4

Fifth place semifinal

Final

 Bronze medal barrage

 Gold medal barrage

References

Sources
 

Fencing at the 1964 Summer Olympics
Men's events at the 1964 Summer Olympics